James Crossley may refer to:

 James Crossley (author) (1800–1883), English author and bibliophile
 James Crossley (bodybuilder) (born 1973), English actor and bodybuilder
 James Crossley (rugby league) (fl. 1930s–1940s), English rugby player

See also
Crossley (name)